Otto, the Merry (23 July 1301 – 17 February 1339), a member of the House of Habsburg, was Duke of Austria and Styria from 1330, as well as Duke of Carinthia from 1335 until his death. He ruled jointly with his elder brother Duke Albert II.

Biography
Otto was born in the Austrian capital Vienna, the youngest son of King Albert I of Germany and Elizabeth of Carinthia, a member of the House of Gorizia-Tyrol (Meinhardiner). His elder brothers were Rudolf III, who became King of Bohemia in 1306, Frederick the Fair, elected King of the Romans in opposition to Louis the Bavarian in 1314, the Austrian dukes Leopold I and Albert II as well as Henry the Friendly.

After the murder of King Albert I in 1308, the Habsburgs lost out in the struggle around the German throne, when Frederick the Fair was defeated by his Wittelsbach rival Louis in the 1322 Battle of Mühldorf. In the course of a rapprochement of both dynasties, Otto married Elizabeth of Wittelsbach, a daughter of Duke Stephen I of Bavaria. In 1327 he founded Neuberg Abbey in Styria, on the occasion of the birth of his first son Frederick II, and the Chapel of Saint George in the Augustinian Church in Vienna. When his wife Elizabeth died in 1330, she was buried at the Neuberg Abbey church.

From 1329 onwards, Otto administrated the original Habsburg possessions in Swabia (Further Austria). In 1330, he and his brother Albert II were enfeoffed with the Austrian duchy. Louis IV, Holy Roman Emperor since 1328, also vested Otto with the title of an Imperial vicar. In February he developed close ties with the mighty House of Luxembourg by secondly marrying Anna of Bohemia, daughter of King John the blind and sister of future emperor Charles IV, in the Moravian royal city of Znojmo.

Two months later, Otto's maternal uncle, the Meinhardiner duke Henry of Carinthia died without male heirs, whereupon Emperor Louis IV on 2 May 1335 ceded the Duchy of Carinthia, the adjacent March of Carniola and the southern part of the Tyrol to Otto and Albrecht as Imperial fiefs in Linz. Otto was enthroned as duke in accordance with the archaic Carantanian rite on the Zollfeld plain, and, from that time onwards, took care of Carinthia rather than of the Austrian duchy. In 1337 he founded the knightly order Societas Templois for the crusade against the pagan Prussian and Lithuanian tribes. His nickname the Merry refers to the festive life at his court.

Otto died at Neuberg Abbey at the age of 37. His sons and titular successors Frederick II and Leopold II died shortly afterwards in 1344 (presumably poisoned), and the line became extinct.

Marriages and children

On 15 May 1325, Otto married his first wife Elizabeth of Bavaria. She was a daughter of Stephen I, Duke of Bavaria and Jutta of Schweidnitz. They had two children:
Frederick II (10 February 1327 – 11 December 1344)
Leopold II, Duke of Austria (1328 – 10 August 1344)

Elizabeth of Bavaria died on 25 March 1330. Otto remained a widower for almost five years. On 16 February 1335, Otto married his second wife Anna of Luxembourg, daughter of King John of Bohemia and his first wife Elizabeth, a member of the Přemyslid dynasty. They would have no children. Anna died on 3 September 1338.

Otto had four illegitimate sons who appear in genealogies. The identities of their mother or mothers and their later fates are unknown:
Otto
Leopold
Johann
Leopold.

Ancestry

|-

External links

Otto the Merry
Otto the Merry
14th-century dukes of Austria
Otto the Merry
Otto the Merry
People of the Northern Crusades
Sons of kings